The MRT Brown Line is a 22.1 km rapid transit line in Bangkok, Thailand proposed monorail mass transit line from Nonthaburi Civic Centre, Nonthaburi Province to Lam Sali intersection, Bang Kapi District. 20 stations are proposed for the line and the expected cost for the project is 48 billion baht. The line has been integrated for 7.2km with the N2 expressway project and a feasibility study has been completed. The MRT Brown line will interchange with 7 other mass transit lines.

The MRT Brown line investment plan was approved by the MRTA Board in June 2019 for final detailed design, which was expected to be completed by December 2020. However, the detailed design will take longer and is not expected to be completed until September 2022. In mid May 2022, the MRTA received updated consultants studies and will soon start drafting the TOR for the project. The project will still require final Cabinet approval and is now planned to be tendered in 2023.

Route Alignment

The MRT Brown Line starts at Nonthaburi Civic Centre where it interchanges with both the MRT Purple Line & MRT Pink Lines. It heads east along Ngam Wong Wan road through Khae Rai intersection and then Vihavadi-Rangsit road to interchange with the SRT Dark Red Line at Bang Khen. The Brown line continues past Kasetsart University to interchange with the BTS Sukhumvit Line at Kasetsart University on Phahon Yothin Road.

The line continues east along Prasote Manukitch Road (AKA Kaset-Nawamin Road) past Chalong Rat Expressway (interchanging with the proposed BMA Grey Line) to Nawamin Road. The line then turns south along Nawamin Road over Lam Phang Phuai lake and past Klong Chan Stadium. The line continues further southeast along Nawamin Road where it then terminates at Ramkhamhaeng rd (soi 129/1), Lam Sali junction to interchange with the MRT Orange Line and MRT Yellow Line.

History
The line was first proposed as the Gold Line by the Pheu Thai party (พรรคเพื่อไทย) for the Bangkok Governors election held in March 2013. This was in response to objections by Kasetsart University and as an alternative to a long-proposed elevated Expressway extension, the N2 expressway project. However, the Pheu Thai candidate did not win the election and the Gold Line proposal was dropped with the then Deputy Minister of Transport stating that land appropriation costs were too high. (The Gold Line name was later used for the BMA Gold Line ).

Subsequently, the Office of Transport and Traffic Policy and Planning (OTP) reworked the Gold Line proposal into a new MRT  Brown Line monorail proposal and this was endorsed by the MRTA Board in August 2013.  The route was under preliminary study by OTP from June 2013, but did not progress much before the May 2014 coup and change of government. Subsequently, the route was finalised by OTP and public hearings into the project were held during 2017 as the government proposed integrating the design with a new expressway. In mid-2017, the MOT announced that a final feasibility study would be completed over 14 months.

Note: This line is not to be confused with the original OTP 2004 13 km MRT Brown Line proposal from Bangkapi to Min Buri which was taken to the 2005 election. In 2009, this plan was subsequently changed and the original 13  km Brown Line was merged into an extended MRT Orange Line, which is currently under construction.

Progress

In August 2013, the MRTA approved the MRT Brown line in principle to complete the design by 2016 with an expected 3-year construction period for a 2021 opening. However, the line was delayed while a long planned expressway along much of the same route was prioritized. Public hearings on the Brown line was held in 2017. The MOT announced that a 14-month feasibility study into the line would be completed by 2018.

The feasibility study was undertaken during the same period where design for the N2 expressway (which runs along Kaset-Namawin rd) was being finalised by EXAT without catering for the MRT Brown Line. Work was expected to commence on the expressway in 2019. OTP and MOT subsequently proposed an integrated design and construction of the Brown Line jointly with the N2 expressway which was approved by Cabinet. However, the Brown Line crossing of Vihavadi-Rangsit rd and the Don Muang elevated expressway might require a diversion of the Brown Line further north for the line to pass at this point depending on the final route design of the N2 expressway. In February 2018, OTP confirmed that the study integrating the MRT Brown Line with the Expressway design would be done by June 2018.

By August 2018, OTP had completed the feasibility study and conducted public hearings. Although, there was much public support for building the MRT Brown line, public opposition to the N2 expressway remained high. OTP intended to submit the project for Cabinet approval by the end of October 2018. In early June 2019, the MRTA Board approved the investment plan for the Brown Line and integrated design with the N2 Expressway conducted by EXAT. The design process was expected to be completed by late 2020 after further discussions regarding land access around Kasetsart University were conducted between EXAT, the MRTA, the Rural Highways Department and Kasetsart University in June 2020. In early November 2020, the MRTA Governor stated that the OTP had submitted the preliminary Environment (EIA) to the National Environment Board for review and that land expropriation surveys in some areas along the route were still being finalised. Final design was expected to be completed by December 2020. However, the detailed design will take longer and is not expected to be completed until September 2022.

The project is expected to be tendered in 2023.

Stations 
The 22.1 km Brown line is proposed to have 20 stations:

Note: Station names are provisional.

Network Map

See also

 Mass Rapid Transit Master Plan in Bangkok Metropolitan Region
 MRT (Bangkok)
 MRT Blue Line
 MRT Grey Line
 MRT Light Blue Line
 MRT Orange Line
 MRT Pink Line
 MRT Purple Line
 MRT Yellow Line
 BTS Skytrain
 BTS Sukhumvit Line
 BTS Silom Line
 Airport Rail Link (Bangkok)
 SRT Light Red Line
 SRT Dark Red Line
 Bangkok BRT
 BMA Gold Line
 BMA Bang Na-Suvarnabhumi Line

References

External links
 "Airport Rail Link, BTS, MRT & BRT network map"
 "MRTA Brown Line" 

Brown line
Proposed public transport in Thailand
Monorails in Thailand